The Entertainment Industry Foundation (EIF), based in Los Angeles, United States, is a 501(c)(3) non-profit charitable organization of the entertainment industry. EIF funds more than 300 charitable organizations annually, both in the Los Angeles area and throughout the entire United States. To date, EIF has pledged more than $1 billion for its philanthropic initiatives.

History 
The Entertainment Industry Foundation (formerly Permanent Charities Committee founded by M. C. Levee) was established in 1942 by Samuel Goldwyn, with friends Humphrey Bogart, James Cagney, and the Warner brothers. Their vision was to unify Hollywood's philanthropy efforts in order to maximize the charitable dollars raised annually, and guarantee that worthy charities receive these contributions. They recognized that banding together would heighten the studios’ impact on World War II relief efforts. A “United Appeal” payroll deduction – a first for any U.S. industry – launched, with $1 million raised.

Celebrity involvement in President Roosevelt's awareness campaign to eradicate childhood polio, as well as fundraising that was a springboard for the establishment of the L.A. paramedic program, are hallmarks of the Foundation's early work. EIF focused on some of the most pressing needs of its time: from the first grants directed to wartime agencies like the United Service Organizations and American Red Cross, to providing funding and creating awareness to help eradicate childhood polio.

EIF initiatives 
The Entertainment Industry Foundation has initiatives to address many health concerns such as cancer, diabetes, and HIV/AIDS, as well as raise awareness about important social and educational issues – especially those affecting children. It has developed programs that support charities in the Hunger and Nutrition spaces as well as quick response funding for Disaster Relief worldwide.

Among EIF's programs are Delivering Jobs, a campaign to create pathways to employment and leadership opportunities for people with intellectual and/or developmental differences; Defy:Disaster, the industry's collective response to natural disasters; Stand Up to Cancer, which funds the newest and most promising cancer treatments to help patients now; and EIF Careers Program, designed to create a more diverse talent pipeline into film and production careers.

Additionally, EIF functions as an umbrella organization and fiscal sponsor for many artists, athletes, and influencers who seek to use their platforms. The Kevin Love Fund, Charlize Theron Africa Outreach Project, Panic! At The Disco Highest Hopes Foundation, Black Music Action Coalition, She is the Music, Know Your Rights Camp, Cher Cares, and Social Change Fund United are among the organizations launched under EIF's platform.

Stand Up To Cancer 

Stand Up To Cancer (SU2C), a division of EIF and its largest initiative, was established in 2008 by film and media leaders who utilize the industry's resources to engage the public in supporting a new, collaborative model of cancer research, and to increase awareness about cancer prevention as well as progress being made in the fight against the disease.

Disaster Relief
EIF's ability to develop “roadblock” telecasts in support of disaster relief efforts is an integral part of its role within the entertainment industry. Efforts like Hope for Haiti Now, Somos una Voz, One Love Manchester, and Graduate Together have provided catalytic funding for organizations and communities around the world when impacted by tragedy.

Defy:Disaster, the Entertainment Industry Foundation's official disaster relief program, is dedicated to providing aid to survivors and communities affected by natural disasters to help them recover and rebuild. The program aims to support immediate and long-term disaster relief with a primary goal of making a powerful and sustainable impact in highly affected areas.

City National Bank pledged its commitment to support the entertainment industry's disaster relief efforts, signing on as a title sponsor of Defy:Disaster.

Education
Thinkitup is an initiative of the EIF to bring attention to improving education in the U.S. It kicked off in 2015 with a live televised fundraising event. The program featured stories of teachers and students working together as well as live musical performances, comedic sketches and more. Together with donorschoose.org, Thinkitup allows students and teachers to crowdfund projects they want to work on, helping prepare students for post-school life.

EIF collaborated with the XQ Institute on its Super School Project to help communities reshape high school so it better prepares students for success. Launched in September 2017, “EIF Presents: XQ Super School Live,” a roadblock telecast, was held on Sept. 8, 2017, with live musical, comedy, and documentary segments that brought to life the past, present and future of the American high school system.

Leadership 
Nicole Sexton has served as president and CEO since 2017.

Board of Directors
The members include: 

Jeff Bader
Lynn Harris
Dan Harrison
Andy Kubitz
Sherry Lansing
Peter Seymour

Chris Silbermann, Chairman
Jack Sussman
Natalie Tran
Danice Woodley

Notes 

Charities based in California
Foundations based in the United States
Organizations established in 1942
Entertainment industry